Jörg Breiding (born 1972) is a German choral conductor and academic teacher. He has been the conductor of the Knabenchor Hannover since 2002. He taught at the Musikhochschule Lübeck, and has been professor of choral conducting at the Folkwang Hochschule.

Career 
Born in Hannover, Breiding studied music pedagogy, voice pedagogy and German at the Musikhochschule Hannover. He also studied conducting choirs and orchestras with Gerd Müller-Lorenz in Lübeck and Heinz Hennig in Hannover. After one year as the assistant of Hennig, who had founded the Knabenchor Hannover in 1950, he succeeded Hennig as artistic director of the boys' choir in January 2002.

Breiding lectured on choral conducting at the Musikhochschule Lübeck from 1998 to 2005. He then became professor of choral conducting at the Folkwang Hochschule, where he founded and conducted the Folkwang Konzertchor and the Folkwang Vokalensemble.

Breiding collaborated in Germany and internationally with ensembles such as Concerto Palatino, London Brass, Barockorchester L’Arco, Hannoversche Hofkapelle, Leipziger Barockorchester, Musica Alta Ripa, Ensemble Resonanz, NDR Radiophilharmonie Hannover, and the Nürnberger Symphoniker, among others.

Recordings 
Breiding conducted radio productions for NDR, WDR and MDR, and made several recordings, including the world premiere recording of sacred music by Andreas Hammerschmidt, titled Verleih uns Frieden – Geistliche Vokalmusik von Andreas Hammerschmidt with the vocal ensemble Himlische Cantorey and the Johann-Rosenmüller-Ensemble. This recording and a CD of new cantatas for the liturgical year, Glaubenslieder – Neue Kantaten zum Kirchenjahr, were awarded the ECHO Klassik in the category choral recording of the year.

Among recordings with Breiding conducting, there are several of choral works by the label  in Leipzig, including:
 Andreas Hammerschmidt – Verleih uns Frieden, 2005
 John Rutter – Magnificat, Bruder Heinrichs Weihnachten, 2007
 Actus tragicus – Kantaten und Motetten auf dem Weg zu Johann Sebastian Bach, 2008
 Dietrich Buxtehude – Membra Jesu Nostri, 2008
 Glaubenslieder – Neue Kantaten zum Kirchenjahr, 2009
 Michael Praetorius – Michaelisvesper, 2009
 Harald Weiss – Requiem, 2010
 Gloria in excelsis Deo – Advents- und Weihnachtslieder mit dem Knabenchor Hannover mit Sätze von Siegfried Strohbach, 2012
 Knabenchor Hannover – Portrait-CD, 2012
 Folkwang Vokal – Vokalmusik vom frühen Mittelalter bis zur Gegenwart. Folkwang CD Edition, Essen 2012
 Christmas Carols – Festliche Musik zur Weihnachtszeit, 2014
 Johann Sebastian Bach – Markuspassion (BWV 247). Rekonstruktion von Simon Heighes (1995), 2014
 Johann Rosenmüller – Marienvesper, 2015

References

External links 

 
 
 
 Jörg Breiding (Conductor) Bach Cantatas Website
 Diogenio Bigaglia (1676–1745) musicweb-international.com 2019
 Johann Rosenmüller (c. 1617 – 1684) / Marienvesper (Vespro della Beata Vergine) musicweb-international.com 2016

German choral conductors
1972 births
Living people
Musicians from Hanover